Samuel Kopásek (born 22 May 2003) is a Slovak professional footballer who currently plays for Fortuna Liga club MŠK Žilina as a right-back.

Club career

MŠK Žilina
Kopásek made his Fortuna Liga debut for Žilina during a away fixture against MFK Ružomberok on 4 May 2022.

References

External links
 MŠK Žilina official club profile 
 
 Futbalnet profile 
 

2003 births
Living people
People from Čadca
Sportspeople from the Žilina Region
Slovak footballers
Slovakia youth international footballers
Association football defenders
MŠK Žilina players
2. Liga (Slovakia) players
Slovak Super Liga players